The Sentinel is the 25th novel in the Jack Reacher series and was published on 27 October 2020. It is the first Jack Reacher book to be co-authored by James Grant and his younger brother Andrew Grant but published using their respective pen names of Lee Child and Andrew Child.

Plot

An unsuspecting information technology specialist in a small town in central Tennessee is about to be kidnapped when Reacher sees an opportunity to help. It turns out that Reacher has stumbled onto something more serious than a kidnapping – a secretive and very serious group thinks the IT specialist has something important that they want, unbeknownst to the specialist, and which Reacher takes it upon himself to sort out.

References

Jack Reacher books
2020 British novels
Collaborative novels
Novels set in Tennessee
Middle Tennessee